This is a comprehensive list of songs by American rock band the Killers.

Original songs

Covers

Unreleased original songs

References

 
Killers